That Bad Eartha  is a twelve-song reconfiguration of material from American singer Eartha Kitt's first two eight-song, 10-inch albums issued by RCA Victor. It contains all eight songs from the 1953 album RCA Victor Presents Eartha Kitt.  It repurposes the cover image and title, and four of the songs from Eartha's 1954 second 10-inch album, That Bad Eartha (10-inch, 8-song album).  In this way, it could be considered an expansion of the first short-length album, supplementing it with packaging and selected songs from the second.

In May 1953, RCA Victor released the 10-inch vinyl album  RCA Victor Presents Eartha Kitt, which reached No. 2 on the pop albums chart and featured 8 songs. The album was recorded in four sessions between March and October 1953 with Henri Rene and His Orchestra .

RCA released her second album, That Bad Eartha, in the 10″ popular format, in 1954. It was also released in a 45 RPM extended play version with two songs on each side of two disks. That Bad Eartha spent 12 weeks on the pop albums chart, peaking at No. 5.

Long-playing records were introduced in 1948 by Columbia with 10-inch albums as the popular music format and the 12-inch album the format for classical music. RCA introduced the 45 RPM format shortly afterwards. By the mid-50s, 10″ LPs were phased out, replaced by 12″ ones for popular as well as classical music.  At this point, in approximately 1956, RCA Victor reconfigured these two 8-song albums into a 12-track album, jettisoning 4 songs.  This then became the standard version of the album.

Several singles were issued from various configurations of these albums. "Under the Bridges of Paris" charted in the UK Singles Chart in 1955 at #7.

Many of the songs recorded for this album, such as "C'est si bon", "Uska Dara" and "I Want to Be Evil" became closely associated with Eartha Kitt, and were performed live by her until one of her last concerts at the Cheltenham Jazz Festival, shortly before her death in December 2008. 
The complete album was re-issued on CD in 1994 as part of the Bear Family Records five-CD boxset Eartha – Quake; this included "Santa Baby" and several other tracks from the same recording session not included in this album.

Track listings

RCA Victor Presents Eartha Kitt (1953)
This was the first incarnation of the album, originally released to 10-inch in late-1953. It was released a few months later in early 1954 as a 45 RPM 7-inch double extended play. In 2010 it was issued as a digital download in select European countries under public domain with alternate artwork by Smith & Co.

10-inch Long Play 
Track list and notes adapted from liner notes of original release.Track lengths adapted from digital release.

7-inch Double Extended Play
Track list and notes adapted from liner notes of original release.Track lengths adapted from digital release.

That Bad Eartha (EP) (1954)
The follow-up to Kitt's first album, RCA Victor Presents Eartha Kitt, That Bad Eartha (EP) was released in 1954, consisting entirely of previously unreleased music. It wasn't until 1956 that a 12-inch album with this title and packaging would be made available; and the later album would only contain four of these songs, with the other eight from her debut. The catalog numbers for the release were LPM-3187 (10-inch version) and EPB3187 (7-inch version).

10-inch Extended Play

7-inch Double Extended Play
Credits adapted from label notes of original release.

10-inch Long Play (United Kingdom Version)
Released in 1955, it wasn't until 1958 that the now standard, 12-inch long play version of the album was released in the United Kingdom. As a result, this version with catalogue number DLP 1067, released by His Master's Voice, is still considered to be the standard track listing for the album in the UK; the 12-inch version being commonly referred to as the "American Version" within the country. The UK version of the album was released with alternative cover artwork, and was later released to a compact disk compilation.

Credits adapted from liner notes of original release.

That Bad Eartha (LP) (1956)
As 12-inch records became more popular, RCA Victor re-issued RCA Victor Presents Eartha Kitt as a 12-inch record with four new songs from That Bad Eartha (EP), releasing it synonymously a year after the extended play's release. This is now considered to be the standard track listing of That Bad Eartha in all countries except the United Kingdom, where this version was not officially released until 1958, three years after a ten-track, long play version of That Bad Eartha (EP) was released in the country as a stand-alone album. During the early 1980s this version of the album was re-issued by RCA on 12-inch in the Netherlands entitled "The Classics" That Bad Eartha. In 1984, following her international commercial success with "Where Is My Man", RCA re-issued this version of the album once again on 12-inch, this time also issuing the first cassette and compact disc versions of the album in Germany, Europe, and the UK. Over the course of the next two decades, RCA Victor would release at least four re-issues of the same CD version throughout Europe. By 1994 songs from the album began becoming available in CD compilations in America by numerous record companies. However, it wasn't until 2002 that a CD featuring the full album would become available, released as a two-for-one with Down To Eartha. In 2006, a version of the album featuring 12 bonus tracks would be released in Italy displaying a new cover designed from an alternate shot of Kitt from the same photo shoot for her original album covers for Down to Eartha and Thursday's Child, two months later it was briefly released in the US. The album has since been issued in its entirety on CD by numerous record labels, often in multi-album compilations, throughout the world, and inevitably as a digital download. As of 2007 this album falls into public domain in Europe and is issued freely, without consent from RCA or its parent company Sony Music Entertainment.

12-inch Long Play

CD (1984)

That Bad Eartha (Japanese version)

7" Extended Play
This was a seven-inch extended play released in Japan of the same name consisting of three songs from different versions of the album and "Santa Baby". It was released with the same cover artwork as Down To Eartha, only changing the letters to "That Bad Eartha", with the same placement and font as the album. Released by Victor of Japan, catalogue number EP-1118.

Track list adapted from label notes of original release.

Personnel
Personnel adapted from AllMusic. Orchestra and chorus members adapted from the liner notes of the 2006 Universe Italy CD release.

Performance
Anton Coppola – Orchestra conductor (for "Monotonous")
Eartha Kitt – vocalist
Henri René – Orchestra conductor, (producer)
Henri René & His Orchestra – performer
Hugo Winterhalter – conductor, (producer)

Chorus members
Betty Allen – choir, chorus
Howard Hudson – choir, chorus
Ada Beth Lee – choir, chorus
Betty Noyes – choir, chorus

Orchestra members
Russell Banzer – bassoon
Milt Bernhart – trombone
Noel Boggs – guitar
Julius Brand – violin
Sidney Brecher – viola
Frederick Buldrini – violin
Robert Byrne – trombone
Warren Covington – trombone
John d'Agostino – trombone
Roland Dupont – trombone
Harold Feldman – oboe
Arnold Fishkind – bass
Calman Fleisig – viola
Harold Furmansky – viola
Harry Glickman – violin
Bernard Greenhouse – cello
Johnny Guarnieri – piano
Allen Hanlon – guitar
Julius Held – violin
Al Hendrickson – guitar
Harry Hoffman – violin
Raymond Hunoz – drums
Harry Katzman – violin
Bernard Kaufman – saxophone
Albert Klink – clarinet, saxophone
Stanley F. Kraft – violin
Jack Lesberg – bass
Arno Levitch – violin
Ivan Lopes – bongos
Charles Magnante – accordion
James Maxwell – trumpet
George Ockner – violin
Eugene Orloff – violin
Pullman Pederson – trombone
Danny Perri – guitar
Victor Piemonte – calliope
Jack Pleis – piano
Edward B. Powell – flute
Ralph Ransell – marimbas
Tommy Romersa – drums
Henry Ross – saxophone
Henry Rowland – piano
Art Ryerson – guitar
Tosha Samaroff – violin
Frank Saracco – trombone
Jack Saunders – drums
Julius Schacter – violin
William Schaffer – trombone

Herman Schertzer – clarinet, saxophone
Lucien Schmit – cello
Sam Shamper – violin
Norris "Bunny" Shawker – drums
Mock Shopnick – bass
Terry Snyder – drums
Melvin "Red" Solomon – trumpet
Sal Spinelli – violin
Phil Stephens – bass
Melvin Tax – saxophone
Anthony Terran – trumpet
Stanley Webb – saxophone

Technical
Joe Carlton – producer, (composer)
Henri René – producer, (Orchestra conductor)
Hugo Winterhalter – producer, (conductor)

Re-issue
Norman Blake – recreation (re-issue)
Joe Foster – producer, recreation (Rev-Ola Records re-issue)
Nicole Garcia – liner notes (re-issue)
Stella Lee – arrangement (re-issue)
Duncan MacDougald, Jr. – liner notes (re-issue)
Andy Morten – artwork, design (re-issue)
Steve Huey – liner notes (Universe Italy re-issue)

Composers
Harold Adamson – composer
Henri Betti – composer
Joe Carlton – composer, (producer)
Dorcas Cochran – composer
Fred Ebb – composer
Duke Ellington – composer
George Gershwin – composer
Ira Gershwin – composer
Bernie Hanighen – composer
Otto Harbach – composer
André Hornez – composer
Joan Javits – composer
Lester Judson – composer
Jimmy Kennedy – composer
Jerome Kern – composer
Jacques Larue – composer
Manuel Alvarez Maciste – composer
Dave Mann – composer
Cole Porter – composer
John Rox – composer
Tom Scott – composer
Vincent Scotto – composer
James Alan Shelton – composer
Nat Simon – composer
Harold Spina – composer
Philip Springer – composer
Tony Springer – composer
Raymond Taylor – composer
Humberto Teixeira – composer
Bobby Troup – composer
Joe Young – composer
Traditional – composer

Release history

References

1953 debut albums
1953 albums
1954 albums
1955 albums
1956 albums
Pop albums by American artists
Eartha Kitt albums
RCA Victor albums
His Master's Voice albums
French-language albums
Albums conducted by Henri René